François al-Hajj (28 July 1953 – 12 December 2007) was a Lebanese major general. He was assassinated by a car bomb on 12 December 2007.

Early life and education
Al Hajj was born in the southern Lebanese town of Rmaich on 28 July 1953. Hajj entered the military academy in 1972 and graduated in 1975.

Military career
Al Hajj fought against the Israeli occupation in South Lebanon and was then transferred to head positions north of the Litani during the 1980s. From 1988 to 1989 he fought, under the leadership of Prime Minister General Aoun, against Syrian forces assaulting the "free zones" of West Beirut during the Lebanese Civil War, he also battled the Lebanese Forces militia. In addition, General Hajj, led the Lebanese Army operation in Dinnieh in 2000. He gained recognition as a brilliant commander during the 15-week operation against Fatah al-Islam in Nahr al-Bared camp northern Lebanon during Summer 2007. He was second in command in the Lebanese army and would have been a contender to replace General Sleiman in the event the latter was elected president. . Hajj was promoted to the rank of major general after his killing.

Assassination
On 12 December 2007, Hajj was assassinated through a car bomb blast in the suburb of Baabda. Four other people, including his bodyguard, also died in the attack. A BMW that contained 35 kilograms of TNT was exploded while Hajj's car drove by. The bomb was triggered by remote control.

Honors and medals
General Francois Hajj received the following honors and medals:
 Medal of War
 Order of the Wounded
 National Cedar Medal of Honor
 Lebanese Order of Merit (3rd degree)
 Order of National Unity
 Order of the Dawn of the South
 Lebanese Order of Merit (1st class)
 National Cedar Medal
 Medal of Loyalty
 Cedar Medal of National Honor
 Commended by the Army Commander over 24 times.

See also
 List of assassinated Lebanese politicians

References

External links
 Lebanon mourns slain army General Francois al-Hajj

1953 births
2007 deaths
People from Bint Jbeil District
Lebanese Maronites
Brigadier generals
Lebanese military personnel
Recipients of the Order of Merit 3rd Grade (Lebanon)
Recipients of the Order of Merit 1st Grade (Lebanon)
Assassinated military personnel
Assassinated Lebanese people
People murdered in Lebanon
Deaths by explosive device